Kaju katli (literally "cashew slice"), also known as  kaju barfi, is an Indian dessert similar to a barfi. Kaju means cashew; barfi is often made by thickening milk with sugar and other ingredients (such as dry fruits and mild spices). Kesar kaju katli includes saffron.

The dish is prepared with cashew nuts soaked in water for a considerable period of time (usually overnight), which are then ground to a paste. Sugar solution is boiled down until a single thread forms when two fingers are dipped into it and pulled apart, after which it is added to the ground cashews. Ghee, saffron (kesar), and dried fruits may also be added. The paste is then spread and flattened in a shallow, flat-bottomed dish and cut into bite-sized diamond-shaped pieces. The pieces are usually decorated with edible silver foil. The finished sweet is usually white or yellow in color depending on the ingredients used for the paste and the proportions of each used. Katli is traditionally eaten during Diwali.

References

External links

Indian desserts
Confectionery
Cashew dishes